Mikhail Grigoryev (born February 1, 1991) is a Russian professional ice hockey defenceman who is currently an unrestricted free agent. He most recently played for Barys Astana of the Kontinental Hockey League (KHL).

Playing career
Grigoryev, began his professional career in 2007 in Khimik Moscow Oblast, speaking before for his farm club. Before the start of the season 2007–08, he signed a contract with Neftyanik from Leninogorsk. The next season Grygoryev also held in the Russian Major League club in the Orsk Yuzhny Ural. As a junior, Salavat Yulaev Ufa drafted him 45th overall in the 2009 KHL Junior Draft.

Awards & Achievements
 Bronze medalist KHL 2010
 Bronze medalist MHL (2): 2010, 2011
 Gagarin Cup Winner 2011

References

External links
 

1991 births
Living people
Admiral Vladivostok players
Avangard Omsk players
Barys Nur-Sultan players
HC Dynamo Moscow players
Lokomotiv Yaroslavl players
Metallurg Magnitogorsk players
Russian ice hockey defencemen
Salavat Yulaev Ufa players
HC Spartak Moscow players
Toros Neftekamsk players
Torpedo Nizhny Novgorod players
Yuzhny Ural Orsk players